The Gladys Half-Hour is a 1958 Australian TV play starring Spike Milligan directed by Royston Morley. It aired 27 August 1958 in Sydney. Milligan made it while in Australia appearing on various radio shows.

It aired in Melbourne on 17 October 1958.

Cast
Spike Milligan
Ray Barrett
John Bluthal
Frank Taylor

References

1950s Australian television plays